Colonel Powell may refer to:

People
 Colin Powell (1937–2021), former U.S. Secretary of State, Chairman of the Joint Chiefs of Staff and 4-star general
 Donald Powell (1896–1942), British India Army officer who was awarded the D.S.O.
 Enoch Powell (1912–1998), British WWII colonel and politician 
 George Gabriel Powell (1710–1779), provincial politician and militia colonel of the colony of South Carolina
 James R. Powell (American city founder) (1814–1883), Alabama state militia colonel and politician
 William Edward Powell (1788–1864), Colonel of the Royal Cardiganshire Militia, politician, Sheriff, Lord Lieutenant, and British MP
 William Thomas Rowland Powell (1815–1878), Colonel of the Royal Cardiganshire Militia, politician, and British MP
 Robert M. Powell (19th century), Confederate colonel in the American Civil War who commanded the 5th Texas Infantry Regiment
 Colonel Powell (17th century), Royalist officer in the English Civil War who fought at Pembroke Castle
 Leven Powell (1737–1810), colonial lieutenant colonel in the Continental Army
 John Wesley Powell (1834–1902), Union brevet lieutenant colonel, geologist and geographer

Fictional characters
 Union Colonel Powell, a fictional character in the 2012 film John Carter
 Katherine Powell, a fictional British Army colonel in the 2015 film Eye in the Sky

See also
 General Powell (disambiguation), any of several general officers who rose through the rank of Colonel

 
 
 Powell (disambiguation)
 Colonel (disambiguation)